The former government of Nikita Khrushchev was dissolved following his removal from the post of the Chairman of the Council of Ministers. Alexei Kosygin was elected Premier by the Politburo and the Central Committee following the removal of Khrushchev. His first government would last for two years, until the 1966 Soviet election held in June. Kosygin's first government saw the re-creation of many ministries that were removed under Khrushchev's previous government.

Ministries

Committees

References 
General

Government of the Soviet Union > List
 

Specific

Soviet governments
1964 establishments in the Soviet Union
1966 disestablishments in the Soviet Union
Era of Stagnation